Khorasanlu (also Romanized as Khorāsānlū; also known as Khurasanlu) is a village in Sain Qaleh Rural District, in the Central District of Abhar County, Zanjan Province, Iran. At the 2006 census, its population was 492, in 139 families.

References 

Populated places in Abhar County